Saulo Tristão (born 15 August 1988) is a Brazilian equestrian. He competed in two events at the 2008 Summer Olympics.

References

1988 births
Living people
Brazilian male equestrians
Olympic equestrians of Brazil
Equestrians at the 2008 Summer Olympics
Equestrians at the 2007 Pan American Games
Sportspeople from São Paulo
Pan American Games competitors for Brazil